The Dubbi Volcano is a stratovolcano located in the Southern Red Sea Region of Eritrea. There have been four known eruptions. Two further events were suspected between 1861 and the 20th century.

On June 13, 2011 an ash cloud that had some influence on air travel was attributed to Dubbi. However, more accurate satellite imagery later showed that Nabro was the volcano that had erupted.

See also
List of volcanoes in Eritrea
List of stratovolcanoes

References

External links
 Volcanoes of Eritrea

Mountains of Eritrea
Stratovolcanoes of Eritrea
Rift volcanoes